Blue Sky Vineyard is a family-owned vineyard and winery in Illinois, owned and operated by Barrett Rochman, Marilyn Rochman, and Jim Ewers.  Blue Sky Vineyard is located in the heart of the Shawnee National Forest and anchors the eastern end of the Shawnee Hills Wine Trail. Located within the Shawnee Hills American Viticultural Area, an area that is federally designated and recognized for its uniqueness in grape growing, Blue Sky Vineyard uses Illinois grapes to produce a number of wines. Karen Hand, Blue Sky Vineyard's winemaker, was the Illinois Grape Growers and Vintners Association's Winemaker of the Year for 2006.  They currently produce 17 different kinds of Illinois wine and 5 American wines ranging from dry to sweet. The Tuscan inspired architecture and interiors of Blue Sky Vineyard's main structure and banquet addition were designed by Nancy Karen Brian, professor at California State University Fresno, in consultation with Blue Sky Vineyard's owners.

References

Wineries in Illinois
2000 establishments in Illinois